Araeovalva minor is a moth in the family Gelechiidae. It is found in South Africa.

References

Endemic moths of South Africa
Gelechiini
Moths described in 1960
Moths of Africa